The Auburn Mall, managed by Simon Property Group, which owns 56.1% of it, is an enclosed shopping mall located on Route 12 in Auburn, Massachusetts, United States, near the intersection of the Massachusetts Turnpike (Interstate 90) and I-290/I-395. 

The mall features Macy's as an anchor.

History
The mall was originally built in 1971 and featured Denholm's and Sears as anchors. Denholm's was converted to Forbes & Wallace, and later to The Outlet, a Providence, Rhode Island-based department store chain. The Outlet store closed in the 1980s and was replaced with Caldor. 

The mall underwent a significant renovation in 1997 which added Filene's as a third anchor. Caldor closed in 1999 and was converted to a Filene's home store. In 2006, the two Filene's stores in the mall were both converted to Macy's.

In October 2015, the mall unveiled plans to add a 10-screen cinema and restaurant in the space occupied by Macy's Home Store which closed on December 1, 2015. By April 2016, those plans were approved. However, in November 2016, the mall abandoned previous plans and proposed a new medical center for the Macy's Home Store space. On June 16, 2017, the mall announced that Reliant Medical Group signed a 20-year lease and opened in the space formerly occupied by Macy's Home Store on February 18, 2019.

On November 7, 2019, it was announced that Sears would be closing on February 16, 2020, as part of a plan to close 96 stores nationwide which left Macy's as the only anchor left.

References

Shopping malls in Massachusetts
Simon Property Group
Buildings and structures in Auburn, Massachusetts
Tourist attractions in Worcester County, Massachusetts
Shopping malls established in 1971